In the UK tax system, personal allowance is the threshold above which income tax is levied on an individual's income.  A person who receives less than their own personal allowance in taxable income (such as earnings and some benefits) in a given tax year does not pay income tax; otherwise, tax must be paid according to how much is earned above this level. Certain residents are entitled to a larger personal allowance than others.  Such groups include: the over-65s (followed by a further increased allowance for over-75s), blind people, and married couples where at least one person in the marriage (or civil partnership) was born before 6 April 1935. People earning over £100,000 a year have a smaller personal allowance. For every £2 earned above £100,000, £1 of the personal allowance is lost; meaning that incomes high enough will not have a personal allowance.

Personal allowance tapering 

On 22 April 2009, the then Chancellor Alistair Darling announced in the 2009 Budget statement that starting in April 2010, those with annual incomes over £100,000 would see their Personal allowance reduced by £1 for every £2 earned over £100,000, until the Personal allowance was reduced to zero, which (in 2010-11) would occur at an income of £112,950.

For every additional £100 earned, the Personal allowance was reduced by £50, meaning that an additional £50 would be taxed at the marginal rate (40%), resulting an additional tax liability of £20, resulting in an effective additional 20% marginal taxation over and above the 40% tax already due.

This resulted in an anomalous effective 60% marginal tax rate in the income band between £100,000 and £112,950, with the marginal tax rate returning to 40% above £112,950. As the Personal allowance has grown over the years, this has resulted in a corresponding increase in the size of the effective marginal 60% tax band. As of 2022-23, the effective 60% marginal tax rate now arises for incomes between £100,000 and £125,140.

History 

On 22 June 2010, the new Chancellor George Osborne, as part of the coalition deal which sought to increase the Personal Allowance to £10,000 from April 2015 as per Lib Dem policy, made the first increase of £1,000, making it £7,475 for the 2011-12 tax year. During the 2011 Budget, the allowance was raised by £630 to £8,105 from April 2012. In 2013, George Osborne revised the plans to increase the Personal Allowance and bring forward to date at which it would reach the £10,000 target. This resulted in the allowance being raised to £9,440 from April 2013, before being increased to £10,000 from April 2014, a year earlier than originally planned.  All these increases in the personal allowance came from rises in the personal tax.  In 2016, Osborne determined that the tax increases no longer applied for personal allowance and decided to cut taxes personal taxes £1,000 less than the 2011 level when he increased the personal allowance to £11,500.

Married Man's allowance
Married Man's allowance was the allowance for a legally married couple. The allowance was given at the man's highest rate of tax. During the early-1990s, then-Chancellor of the Exchequer, Norman Lamont overhauled the allowance and introduced the 10% allowance, which meant that all men had the same amount of money in their pocket, irrespective of highest tax rate.  The allowance was scrapped from April 2000, first being announced in then-Chancellor Gordon Brown's 1999 budget, with the exception of people married, or in civil partnerships (introduced in 2005) where one spouse was born before 6 April 1935.

History of allowances

See also
Income tax in Scotland
Welsh Rates of Income Tax

References

External links
 UK Government website: Income Tax rates and Personal Allowances
 Detailed list of rates paid between 1972 - 2005: Tax History- UK Historic Personal Tax Regime
 About the Personal Savings Allowance: Why you need to know about new Personal Savings Allowance

Income taxes
Personal taxes
Taxation in the United Kingdom